Jang Woo-young (Hangul: 장우영; Hanja: 張祐榮; born on April 30, 1989), better known mononymously as Wooyoung, is a South Korean singer, songwriter, dancer and actor. In 2008, he debuted as a member of 2PM, a boy band currently managed by JYP Entertainment. He is mainly known for his work in 2PM and his role as Jason in the South Korean drama Dream High.

Aside from his work in 2PM, he has hosted SBS' music show Inkigayo from July 2009 to July 2010 as well as the KBS talk show Win Win from February to August 2010. He debuted as a solo artist with his first extended play, 23, Male, Single, in July 2012. He has also composed several songs for 2PM, his solo music, and other artists.

Career

2PM

On 4 September 2008, Wooyoung debuted as part of 2PM in their first single "10 Points out of 10 Points" (Korean: "10점 만점에 10점") from their single album Hottest Time of the Day. They have released six studio albums in Korea and four studio albums in Japan.

Solo work

On May 24, 2012, it was revealed that Wooyoung would have released a solo album in early July. On June 28, he performed the title track "Sexy Lady" at the Mnet 20's Choice awards. His first solo mini-album 23, Male, Single was released on July 8 and included two self-composed songs by fellow 2PM members, Junho and Jun.K. In September 2012, Wooyoung, along with JY Park, Taecyeon and miss A's Suzy, promoted the clothing line Reebok's Classic Campaign with a collaboration song named "Classic". On June 9, 2014, Wooyoung released two duets: "Two Hands Clasped" with Park Se-young, and "Fireflies' Glow" with lel.

On March 4, 2015, he made his solo debut in Japan with the single R.O.S.E, preceded by a tour of concerts in Tokyo, Osaka, and Aichi in February. He released music videos for tracks "R.O.S.E" and "Happy Birthday", and, in April, the music video for the Korean version of "R.O.S.E". In 2017, he released two extended plays in Japan: Party Shots in April and Mada boku wa... in October.

Hosting
Wooyoung, along with fellow 2PM member Taecyeon, hosted SBS's music show Inkigayo from July 2009 to July 2010. On February 2, 2010, he was named a sub-MC for Kim Seung-woo's KBS talk show Win Win alongside Girls' Generation's Taeyeon, Kim Shin-young, and Choi Hwa-jung. He received praise as a genius in the making for his natural MC style and quick wit. He left the show on August 3, along with Taeyeon, to focus on 2PM's first concert.

Acting
Wooyoung debuted as an actor in the 2011 KBS drama series Dream High, in which he played the role of Jason, a Korean-American. His performance in the drama made him famous for the English line "Is it my turn already?"; he had help from fellow 2PM members Taecyeon and Nichkhun with his English due to their both being experienced in the language. After his drama debut in Dream High, Wooyoung expressed a desire to continue acting while maintaining a musical career. A representative for JYP Entertainment noted the future opportunities, saying "We're planning to continue Wooyoung's acting career when he receives another great project. He was worried before Dream High began filming, and often wondered whether he'd be able to act, but we believe that he's gained a lot of confidence since then. He's gotten very interested in the acting field, so we plan to continue his acting career, along with fellow member Taecyeon's."

In September 2011, Wooyoung and Dream High co-star Suzy made a cameo appearance in the KBS Drama Special Human Casino. The two idols played the role of a couple caught up in gambling scandals. Their scene wasn't a part of the actual drama, but were rather featured towards the end with the rolling credits. The producer stated "I told these two that I was starting a new project and they told me they wanted to visit, so I thought of giving them a small cameo role."

Dancing
Wooyoung trained actress Kim Gyu-ri for her performance on MBC's Dancing With the Stars in July 2011. Netizens praised his talents as a dancer for having the chance to teach others about it.

For 2PM's tours in 2011 (Hands Up Asia Tour and Republic of 2PM), Junho and Wooyoung performed a duet that Junho wrote, while Wooyoung choreographed and designed their outfits.

Endorsements
In 2011, Taecyeon and Wooyoung modeled for the fall collection of the clothing brand Evisu, and in 2012 for the spring-summer collection. In September he modeled for Reebok's Classic Campaign. In August 2014, Wooyoung was announced as new face of Recipe Cosmetics.

Personal life
In 2009, he began studying broadcasting at Howon University.

Wooyoung enlisted in the Army for his mandatory military service on July 9, 2018. He was supposed to be discharged on February 28, 2020. However, on February 25, a representative from JYP Entertainment confirmed that Wooyoung was already discharged, a few days earlier than his scheduled discharge date, due to the COVID-19 pandemic in South Korea.

Filmography

Films

Television  series

Television  shows

Web shows

Radio shows

Hosting

DVDs

Discography

Extended plays

Singles

Collaborations

Compositions

Awards and nominations

References

External links

  
 R.O.S.E official website 
 Party Shots official website 
 Mada boku wa... official website 

1989 births
Living people
2PM members
Howon University alumni
JYP Entertainment artists
People from Busan
South Korean Buddhists
South Korean dance musicians
South Korean male film actors
South Korean male idols
South Korean male singers
South Korean male television actors
South Korean pop singers
South Korean rhythm and blues singers
Indong Jang clan